Arsenaria vesceritalis is a species of snout moth in the genus Arsenaria. It was described by Pierre Chrétien in 1913 and is known from Algeria.

References

Moths described in 1913
Hypotiini
Endemic fauna of Algeria
Moths of Africa